Chama gryphoides is a species of cemented saltwater clam, a marine bivalve mollusc in the family Chamidae, the jewel boxes.

This species is known in the fossil record from the Miocene to the Quaternary (age range 20.43 to 0.781 million years ago.). Fossil shells of this species have been found in Italy, Spain, United Kingdom, Algeria, Austria, Bulgaria, Cyprus, France, Germany, Greece, Hungary, Moldova, Morocco, Poland, Romania and Slovakia.

Description
These shells are thick, heavy, almost oval and inequivalve. The left valve is large and deep, while the right one is flatter. The radial ribs are quite irregular and arranged in concentric rows.

Distribution
This species has a Mediterranean distribution. It can be found at depths of 10 to 200 m.

References

External links
 Liceo Foscarini
 Conchology

Chamidae
Molluscs described in 1758
Taxa named by Carl Linnaeus